The 1995 Toledo Rockets football team was an American football team that represented the University of Toledo in the Mid-American Conference (MAC) during the 1995 NCAA Division I-A football season. In their fifth season under head coach Gary Pinkel, the Rockets compiled an 11–0–1 record (7–0–1 against MAC opponents), won the MAC championship, outscored all opponents by a combined total of 411 to 264, and defeated Nevada in overtime in the Las Vegas Bowl, 40–37.

The team's statistical leaders included Ryan Huzjak with 1,880 passing yards, Wasean Tait with 1,905 rushing yards, and Steven Rosi with 505 receiving yards.

Schedule

References

Toledo
Toledo Rockets football seasons
Mid-American Conference football champion seasons
Las Vegas Bowl champion seasons
College football undefeated seasons
Toledo Rockets football